The recluse spiders (Loxosceles, also known as brown spiders, fiddle-backs, violin spiders, and reapers, is a genus of spiders that was first described by R. T. Lowe in 1832. They are venomous spiders known for their bite, which sometimes produces a characteristic set of symptoms known as loxoscelism.

Recluse spiders are now identified as members of the family Sicariidae, having formerly been placed in their own family, the Loxoscelidae. Although recluse spiders are feared, they are usually not aggressive.

Relation with other spiders
Sicariidae are of the superfamily Scytodoidea. Other families in the Scytodoidea include Drymusidae, Scytodidae, and Periegopidae.

Habitat and appearance

Loxosceles is distributed nearly worldwide in warmer areas.  All have six eyes arranged in three groups of two (dyads) and some are brownish with a darker brown characteristic violin marking on the cephalothorax. However, the "violin marking" cannot be used as a reliable way to identify the spider as many unrelated species of spider have similar markings. Recluses are typically about 7–12 mm long.

The most common and most famous species in the United States is the brown recluse spider (Loxosceles reclusa).  It is found in a large area of the Midwest, west to Colorado and the New Mexico state line and east to northern Georgia. Sporadic records from other locations only represent incidental introductions, not established populations. The brown recluse feeds on whatever small prey is available, and has been observed to prefer scavenging over actively hunting. Other notable members of this genus include the Chilean recluse spider (L. laeta) and the Mediterranean recluse spider (L. rufescens).

Recently, concerns have been raised regarding recluses spreading faster due to warmer air carrying them farther as a result of changing climate. On the contrary, newly hatched recluses do not travel via ballooning and thus the populations are confined to very tight spaces with dense populations. Most Loxosceles can live for one and a half to two years. Many species of this genus can live for very long times without food or water. Insecticides often fail to kill the spider, instead intoxicating its nervous system and inducing erratic behavior.

Identification 
This genus is very hard to identify, as they have very simple coloration and morphology. Many other spiders have similar dorsal markings, leading to confusion and misidentification. They can be most readily distinguished by having 6 eyes, arranged in three pairs. None of the pairs of eyes touch each other, and are arranged in a U shape. The presence of two claws per foot and a rather flat cephalothorax further help distinguish them.

Venom components and effects
Loxosceles spiders, like Hexophthalma species, have potent tissue-destroying venoms containing the dermonecrotic agent  which is otherwise found only in a few pathogenic bacteria. Recent research has indicated the venom is composed largely of sulfated nucleosides, though these compounds are relatively new discoveries, so little is known about them. The venom of several species is capable of producing necrotic lesions that are slow to heal and may require skin grafts. Rarely, the venom is carried by the bloodstream, causing red blood cell destruction.

The venom is identical in male and female spiders, but females can have almost twice the concentration of toxins. For unknown reasons, the toxicity of the venom to mammalian species varies; recluse bites may cause necrosis in humans, rabbits, and guinea pigs, but not in mice or rats.

The Chilean recluse (L. laeta) supposedly has a more potent venom, which results in systemic involvement more often. All Loxosceles species that have been tested have venoms similar to that of the brown recluse, and all should be avoided. In general, though, they are not aggressive and commonly occupy human dwellings without causing problems.

Many types of skin wounds are mistaken for or assumed to be the result of a recluse spider bite. Several diseases can mimic the lesions of the bite, including Lyme disease, various fungal and bacterial infections, and the first sore of syphilis. It is important to associate the spider directly with the bite to avoid improper treatment, and to successfully treat common infections or other conditions if no spider was seen.

Bites most often occur as a defense when the spider is trapped against the skin, in clothing, for example. The total volume of venom is minute (only 2 micrograms injected out of 4 microliters in the venom glands).

The bite of a recluse spider can generally be categorized into one of the following groups:
 Unremarkable – self-healing minute damage
 Mild reaction – self-healing damage with itchiness, redness, patterns of aggressive behavior and a mild lesion.
 Dermonecrotic – the uncommon, "classic" recluse bite, producing a necrotic skin lesion. About 66% of necrotic bite lesions  heal with no complications. In extreme cases, the lesion may be up to 40 millimeters wide, last for several months, and heal with a permanent scar.
 Systemic or viscerocutaneous – an extremely rare, systemic reaction to envenomation of the bloodstream. It is observed more often in children.

Most bites are unremarkable or mild.

Species
 it contains 143 species, found in Central America, the Caribbean, Oceania, Asia, Africa, North America, Europe, and South America:

L. accepta Chamberlin, 1920 – Peru
L. adelaida Gertsch, 1967 – Brazil
L. alamosa Gertsch & Ennik, 1983 – Mexico
L. amazonica Gertsch, 1967 – Peru, Brazil
L. anomala (Mello-Leitão, 1917) – Brazil
L. apachea Gertsch & Ennik, 1983 – USA, Mexico
L. aphrasta Wang, 1994 – China
L. aranea Gertsch, 1973 – Mexico
L. arizonica Gertsch & Mulaik, 1940 – USA
L. aurea Gertsch, 1973 – Mexico
L. baja Gertsch & Ennik, 1983 – Mexico
L. barbara Gertsch & Ennik, 1983 – Mexico
L. belli Gertsch, 1973 – Mexico
L. bentejui Planas & Ribera, 2015 – Canary Is.
L. bergeri Strand, 1906 – Namibia
L. bettyae Gertsch, 1967 – Peru
L. blancasi Gertsch, 1967 – Peru
L. blanda Gertsch & Ennik, 1983 – USA
L. boneti Gertsch, 1958 – Mexico, El Salvador
L. candela Gertsch & Ennik, 1983 – Mexico
L. carabobensis González-Sponga, 2010 – Venezuela
L. cardosoi Bertani, von Schimonsky & Gallão, 2018 – Brazil
L. caribbaea Gertsch, 1958 – Greater Antilles
L. carinhanha Bertani, von Schimonsky & Gallão, 2018 – Brazil
L. carmena Gertsch & Ennik, 1983 – Mexico
L. cederbergensis Lotz, 2017 – South Africa
L. chapadensis Bertani, Fukushima & Nagahama, 2010 – Brazil
L. chinateca Gertsch & Ennik, 1983 – Mexico
L. coheni Zamani, Mirshamsi & Marusik, 2021 – southwestern Iran
L. colima Gertsch, 1958 – Mexico
L. conococha Gertsch, 1967 – Peru
L. coquimbo Gertsch, 1967 – Chile
L. corozalensis González-Sponga, 2010 – Venezuela
L. coyote Gertsch & Ennik, 1983 – Mexico
L. cubana Gertsch, 1958 – Cuba, Bahama Is., HIspaniola
L. cubiroensis González-Sponga, 2010 – Venezuela
L. curimaguensis González-Sponga, 2010 – Venezuela
L. dejagerae Lotz, 2017 – South Africa
L. deserta Gertsch, 1973 – USA, Mexico
L. devia Gertsch & Mulaik, 1940 – USA, Mexico
L. diaguita Brescovit, Taucare-Ríos, Magalhaes & Santos, 2017 – Chile
L. ericsoni Bertani, von Schimonsky & Gallão, 2018 – Brazil
L. fontainei Millot, 1941 – Guinea
L. foutadjalloni Millot, 1941 – Guinea
L. francisca Gertsch & Ennik, 1983 – Mexico
L. frizzelli Gertsch, 1967 – Peru
L. gaucho Gertsch, 1967 – Brazil. Introduced to Tunisia
L. gloria Gertsch, 1967 – Ecuador, Peru
L. griffinae Lotz, 2017 – Namibia
L. guajira Cala-Riquelme, Gutiérrez-Estrada & Flórez, 2015 – Colombia
L. guatemala Gertsch, 1973 – Guatemala
L. guayota Planas & Ribera, 2015 – Canary Is.
L. haddadi Lotz, 2017 – South Africa
L. harrietae Gertsch, 1967 – Peru
L. herreri Gertsch, 1967 – Peru
L. hirsuta Mello-Leitão, 1931 – Brazil, Paraguay, Argentina
L. huasteca Gertsch & Ennik, 1983 – Mexico
L. hupalupa Planas & Ribera, 2015 – Canary Is.
L. imazighen Ribera & Massa, 2021 - Morocco
L. immodesta (Mello-Leitão, 1917) – Brazil
L. inca Gertsch, 1967 – Peru
L. insula Gertsch & Ennik, 1983 – Mexico
L. intermedia Mello-Leitão, 1934 – Brazil, Argentina
L. irishi Lotz, 2017 – Namibia
L. jaca Gertsch & Ennik, 1983 – Mexico
L. jamaica Gertsch & Ennik, 1983 – Jamaica
L. jarmila Gertsch & Ennik, 1983 – Jamaica
L. julia Gertsch, 1967 – Peru
L. kaiba Gertsch & Ennik, 1983 – USA
L. karstica Bertani, von Schimonsky & Gallão, 2018 – Brazil
L. lacroixi Millot, 1941 – Ivory Coast
L. lacta Wang, 1994 – China
L. laeta (Nicolet, 1849) – South America. Introduced to USA, Finland, Australia
L. lawrencei Caporiacco, 1955 – Venezuela, Trinidad, Curaçao
L. lutea Keyserling, 1877 – Colombia, Ecuador
L. luteola Gertsch, 1973 – Mexico
L. mahan Planas & Ribera, 2015 – Canary Is.
L. maisi Sánchez-Ruiz & Brescovit, 2013 – Cuba
L. makapanensis Lotz, 2017 – South Africa
L. malintzi Valdez-Mondragón, Cortez-Roldán, Juárez-Sánchez & Solís-Catalán, 2018 – Mexico
L. manuela Gertsch & Ennik, 1983 – Mexico
L. maraisi Lotz, 2017 – Namibia
L. martha Gertsch & Ennik, 1983 – USA
L. meruensis Tullgren, 1910 – Ethiopia, Kenya, Tanzania
L. misteca Gertsch, 1958 – Mexico
L. mogote Sánchez-Ruiz & Brescovit, 2013 – Cuba
L. mrazig Ribera & Planas, 2009 – Tunisia
L. mulege Gertsch & Ennik, 1983 – Mexico
L. muriciensis Fukushima, de Andrade & Bertani, 2017 – Brazil
L. nahuana Gertsch, 1958 – Mexico
L. neuvillei Simon, 1909 – Ethiopia, Somalia, East Africa
L. niedeguidonae de Andrade, Bertani, Nagahama & Barbosa, 2012 – Brazil
L. olivaresi González-Sponga, 2010 – Venezuela
L. olmea Gertsch, 1967 – Peru
L. pallalla Brescovit, Taucare-Ríos, Magalhaes & Santos, 2017 – Chile
L. palma Gertsch & Ennik, 1983 – USA, Mexico
L. panama Gertsch, 1958 – Panama
L. parramae Newlands, 1981 – South Africa
L. persica Ribera & Zamani, 2017 – Iran
L. pilosa Purcell, 1908 – Namibia, South Africa
L. piura Gertsch, 1967 – Peru
L. pucara Gertsch, 1967 – Peru
L. puortoi Martins, Knysak & Bertani, 2002 – Brazil
L. reclusa Gertsch & Mulaik, 1940 – North America
L. rica Gertsch & Ennik, 1983 – Costa Rica
L. rosana Gertsch, 1967 – Peru
L. rothi Gertsch & Ennik, 1983 – Mexico
L. rufescens (Dufour, 1820) (type) – Southern Europe, northern Africa to Iran. Introduced to USA, Mexico, Macaronesia, South Africa, India, China, Japan, Korea, Laos, Thailand, Australia, Hawaii
L. rufipes (Lucas, 1834) – Guatemala, Panama, Colombia. Introduced to West Africa
L. russelli Gertsch & Ennik, 1983 – USA
L. sabina Gertsch & Ennik, 1983 – USA
L. sansebastianensis González-Sponga, 2010 – Venezuela
L. seri Gertsch & Ennik, 1983 – Mexico
L. similis Moenkhaus, 1898 – Brazil
L. simillima Lawrence, 1927 – Southern Africa
L. smithi Simon, 1897 – Ethiopia, Malawi, Kenya, Tanzania
L. sonora Gertsch & Ennik, 1983 – Mexico
L. spadicea Simon, 1907 – Peru, Bolivia, Argentina
L. speluncarum Simon, 1893 – South Africa
L. spinulosa Purcell, 1904 – South Africa
L. surca Gertsch, 1967 – Peru, Chile
L. taeniopalpis Simon, 1907 – Ecuador
L. taino Gertsch & Ennik, 1983 – Bahama Is., Jamaica, Hispaniola
L. tazarte Planas & Ribera, 2015 – Canary Is.
L. tehuana Gertsch, 1958 – Mexico
L. tenango Gertsch, 1973 – Mexico
L. tenochtitlan Valdez-Mondragón, 2019 – Mexico
L. teresa Gertsch & Ennik, 1983 – Mexico
L. tibicena Planas & Ribera, 2015 – Canary Is.
L. tlacolula Gertsch & Ennik, 1983 – Mexico
L. tolantongo Navarro-Rodríguez & Valdez-Mondragón, 2020 - Mexico
L. troglobia Souza & Ferreira, 2018 – Brazil
L. turanensis Zamani et al., 2020 – southern Turkmenistan and eastern Iran
L. valdosa Gertsch, 1973 – Mexico
L. vallenar Brescovit, Taucare-Ríos, Magalhaes & Santos, 2017 – Chile
L. variegata Simon, 1897 – Paraguay
L. vicentei Taucare-Ríos, Brescovit & Villablanca, 2022 - Chile
L. virgo Gertsch & Ennik, 1983 – Virgin Is.
L. vonwredei Newlands, 1980 – Namibia
L. weyrauchi Gertsch, 1967 – Peru
L. willianilsoni Fukushima, de Andrade & Bertani, 2017 – Brazil
L. yucatana Chamberlin & Ivie, 1938 – Mexico, Belize, Guatemala
L. zapoteca Gertsch, 1958 – Mexico

See also
 List of Sicariidae species
 Spider families
 List of spiders associated with cutaneous reactions
 Chilean recluse

References

External links

 Arachnology Home Pages: Loxosceles: Recluse spiders
 Biodiversity Explorer: Family Sicariidae.
 World Spider Catalog. 2014.
 Vetter, R. 2003. "Causes of Necrotic Wounds other than Brown Recluse Spider Bites".
 Vetter, R. 2003. "Myth of the Brown Recluse: Fact, Fear, and Loathing".
 Pictures of L. reclusa and wound (free for noncommercial use)

Loxosceles
Spiders of Africa
Spiders of Asia
Spiders of North America
Spiders of South America

de:Sicariidae